The Night Took Us In like Family is the first collaborative studio album by American record producer L'Orange and American rapper Jeremiah Jae. It was released via Mello Music Group on April 21, 2015. It features guest appearances from Gift of Gab and Homeboy Sandman.

Critical reception

Tim Sendra of AllMusic wrote: "Whether it's a one-off or the start of a beautiful relationship, Jae and L'Orange sound made for each other and this collaboration is first-rate hip-hop storytelling." Anupa Mistry of Pitchfork described the album as "an aesthetic concept record (billed, cringingly, as 'noir hop') that teasingly ponders the idea of gangster rap from another era—pre-Scarface, for once."

Track listing

Personnel
Credits adapted from liner notes.

 L'Orange – production
 Jeremiah Jae – vocals
 Gift of Gab – vocals (5)
 Homeboy Sandman – vocals (8)
 Michael Tolle – executive production

References

External links
 The Night Took Us In like Family at Bandcamp
 

2015 albums
Collaborative albums
Jeremiah Jae albums
Mello Music Group albums